Winterborne Monkton is a small village and civil parish in the county of Dorset in southern England. It lies close to the A354 road between the county town Dorchester,  to the north, and the coastal resort Weymouth,  to the south. Dorset County Council's 2013 mid-year estimate of the parish population was 50.

Winterborne Monkton village consists of a few houses and the church of St Simon & St Jude.

The hill fort of Maiden Castle stands to the northwest.

References

External links

 Winterborne Monkton Local History

Villages in Dorset